Heritage Christian School is a private Christian day school located in Indianapolis, Indiana, in the United States on the SE corner of Binford Boulevard and 75th Street. There are currently 1,200 students in preschool through 12th grade.

School System 
Elementary School: Preschool - 4th Grade

Intermediate School: 5th - 6th Grade

Middle School: 7th - 8th Grade

High School: 9th - 12th Grade

Accreditation 
Heritage Christian School is an independent Christian school and is fully accredited by the Association of Christian Schools International (ACSI) and the North Central Association of Colleges and Schools (NCA).

Athletics

Heritage Christian School has been a member of the Indiana High School Athletic Association since 2001 and offers 18 varsity sanctioned sports as well as girls and boys lacrosse. HCS participates as a Class 2A school and have competed in and achieved success at multiple levels across a variety of sports. They are Members of the Circle City Conference.

Notable Alumni 

 Tyasha Harris - American Professional Basketball Player
 Kent Brantly - American doctor and the 2014 Time Magazine Person of the Year
 Kelly Faris - American Professional Basketball Player
 Conor Daly - IndyCar Driver
 Dayo Okeniyi - Nigerian-American actor
 Todd Abernethy - Assistant Basketball Coach at Ole Miss
 Jake Short - American actor

References

Christian schools in Indiana
Schools in Indianapolis
Private high schools in Indiana
Private middle schools in Indiana
Nondenominational Christian schools in the United States
IHSAA Conference-Independent Schools
Circle City Conference schools
1965 establishments in Indiana
Educational institutions established in 1965